"Just Git It Together" is a song recorded by Lisa Lisa and Cult Jam from their 1989 album Straight to the Sky featuring Ex Girlfriend on background vocals. It reached number sixteen on the Billboard R&B singles chart and number seven on the Dance chart.

Charts

References

External links
 Just Git It Together at Discogs.

1989 singles
Lisa Lisa and Cult Jam songs
1989 songs
Columbia Records singles